Grevillea eryngioides, commonly called curly grevillea, is a species of flowering plant in the family Proteaceae and is endemic to the south-west of Western Australia. It is shrub with low clumping foliage with erect flowering spikes, divided leaves with oblong to egg-shaped lobes, and groups of purplish-red flowers with a yellow style.

Description
Both surfaces of the leaves are glabrous and glaucous.

Taxonomy
Grevillea eryngioides was first formally described in 1870 by George Bentham in Flora Australiensis from specimens collected by James Drummond. The specific epithet (eryngioides) means "Eryngium-like".

Distribution and habitat
Curly grevillea gows in heath or shrubland and is widespread between Morawa, Lake Grace, Coolgardie and Peak Charles National Park in the Avon Wheatbelt, Coolgardie, Esperance Plains, Geraldton Sandplains and Mallee biogeographic regions of south-western Western Australia.

See also
 List of Grevillea species

References

eryngioides
Endemic flora of Western Australia
Eudicots of Western Australia
Proteales of Australia
Taxa named by George Bentham
Plants described in 1870